Formerly a single nation that was annexed by Japan in 1910, the Korean Peninsula has been divided into North Korea and South Korea since the end of World War II on 2 September 1945. The two governments were founded in the two regions in 1948, leading to the consolidation of division. The two countries became opposite and engaged in the Korean War from 1950 to 1953 which ended in an armistice agreement but without a peace treaty.  North Korea is a one-party totalitarian state run by the Kim dynasty. South Korea was formerly governed by a succession of military dictatorships, save for a brief one-year democratic period from 1960 to 1961, until thorough democratization in 1987, after which direct elections were held. Both nations claim the entire Korean peninsula and outlying islands. Both nations joined the United Nations in 1991 and are recognized by most member states. Since the 1970s, both nations have held informal diplomatic dialogues in order to ease military tensions. In 2000, President Kim Dae-jung became the first President of South Korea to visit North Korea, 55 years after the peninsula was divided.

Under President Kim, South Korea adopted the Sunshine Policy in pursuit of more peaceful relationships with North Korea. The policy established the Kaesong Industrial Region, among other things. This policy was continued by the next president Roh Moo-hyun who also visited North Korea in 2007 and met with North Korean leader Kim Jong-il. Through this meeting both leaders signed a declaration to pursue peace and recover inter-Korean relations. However, faced with growing criticism, the Sunshine Policy was discontinued under the next two governments. During Lee Myung-bak and Park Geun-Hye's presidencies, the relationship between North and South Korea became more hostile.
 
In 2018, beginning with North Korea's participation in the 2018 Winter Olympics, the relationship has seen a major diplomatic breakthrough and become significantly warmer. In April 2018, the two countries signed the Panmunjom Declaration for Peace, Prosperity and Unification of the Korean Peninsula. In 2018, a majority of South Koreans approved the new relationship. The summits between North and South Korea have also facilitated positive relationships between North Korea and the United States. However, tensions between the two countries remain.

Division of Korea 

The Korean peninsula had been occupied by Japan from 1910. On 9 August 1945, in the closing days of World War II, the Soviet Union declared war on Japan and advanced into Korea. Though the Soviet declaration of war had been agreed by the Allies at the Yalta Conference, the US government became concerned at the prospect of all of Korea falling under Soviet control. The US government therefore requested Soviet forces halt their advance at the 38th parallel north, leaving the south of the peninsula, including the capital, Seoul, to be occupied by the US. This was incorporated into General Order No. 1 to Japanese forces after the Surrender of Japan on 15 August. On 24 August, the Red Army entered Pyongyang and established a military government over Korea north of the parallel. American forces landed in the south on 8 September and established the United States Army Military Government in Korea.

The Allies had originally envisaged a joint trusteeship which would steer Korea towards independence, but most Korean nationalists wanted independence immediately. Meanwhile, the wartime co-operation between the Soviet Union and the US deteriorated as the Cold War took hold. Both occupying powers began promoting into positions of authority Koreans aligned with their side of politics and marginalizing their opponents. Many of these emerging political leaders were returning exiles with little popular support. In North Korea, the Soviet Union supported Korean Communists. Kim Il-sung, who from 1941 had served in the Soviet Army, became the major political figure. Society was centralized and collectivized, following the Soviet model. Politics in the South was more tumultuous, but the strongly anti-Communist Syngman Rhee emerged as the most prominent politician.

The US government took the issue to the United Nations, which led to the formation of the United Nations Temporary Commission on Korea (UNTCOK) in 1947. The Soviet Union opposed this move and refused to allow UNTCOK to operate in the North. UNTCOK organized a general election in the South, which was held on 10 May 1948. The Republic of Korea was established with Syngman Rhee as president, and formally replaced the US military occupation on 15 August. In North Korea, the Democratic People's Republic of Korea was declared on 9 September, with Kim Il-sung as prime minister. Soviet forces left the North on 10 December 1948. US forces left the South the following year, though the US Korean Military Advisory Group remained to train the Republic of Korea Army.

Both opposing governments considered themselves to be the government of the whole of Korea, and both saw the division as temporary. The DPRK proclaimed Seoul to be its official capital, a position not changed until 1972.

Korean War

North Korea invaded the South on 25 June 1950, and swiftly overran most of the country. In September 1950 the United Nations force, led by the United States, intervened to defend the South, and advanced into North Korea. As they neared the border with China, Chinese forces intervened on behalf of North Korea, shifting the balance of the war again. Fighting ended on 27 July 1953, with an armistice that approximately restored the original boundaries between North and South Korea. Syngman Rhee refused to sign the armistice, but reluctantly agreed to abide by it. The armistice inaugurated an official ceasefire but did not lead to a peace treaty. It established the Korean Demilitarized Zone (DMZ), a buffer zone between the two sides, that intersected the 38th parallel but did not follow it. North Korea has announced that it will no longer abide by the armistice at least six times, in the years 1994, 1996, 2003, 2006, 2009, and 2013.

Large numbers of people were displaced as a result of the war, and many families were divided by the reconstituted border. In 2007 it was estimated that around 750,000 people remained separated from immediate family members, and family reunions have long been a diplomatic priority for the South.

Cold War

Competition between North and South Korea became key to decision-making on both sides. For example, the construction of the Pyongyang Metro spurred the construction of one in Seoul. In the 1980s, the South Korean government built a 98m tall flagpole in its village of Daeseong-dong in the DMZ. In response, North Korea built a 160m tall flagpole in its nearby village of Kijŏng-dong.

Tensions escalated in the late 1960s with a series of low-level armed clashes known as the Korean DMZ Conflict. During this time North and South Korea conducted covert raids on each other in a series of retaliatory strikes, which included assassination attempts on the South and North leaders. On 21 January 1968, North Koreans commandos attacked the South Korean Blue House. On 11 December 1969, a South Korean airliner was hijacked.

During preparations for US President Nixon's visit to China in 1972, South Korean President Park Chung-hee initiated covert contact with the North's Kim Il-sung. In August 1971, the first Red Cross talks between North and South Korea were held. Many of the participants were really intelligence or party officials. In May 1972, Lee Hu-rak, the director of the Korean CIA, secretly met with Kim Il-sung in Pyongyang. Kim apologized for the Blue House Raid, denying he had approved it. In return, North Korea's deputy premier Pak Song-chol made a secret visit to Seoul. On 4 July 1972, the North-South Joint Statement was issued. The statement announced the Three Principles of Reunification: first, reunification must be solved independently without interference from or reliance on foreign powers; second, reunification must be realized in a peaceful way without use of armed forces against each other; finally, reunification transcend the differences of ideologies and institutions to promote the unification of Korea as one ethnic group. It also established the first "hotline" between the two sides.

North Korea suspended talks in 1973 after the kidnapping of South Korean opposition leader Kim Dae-jung by the Korean CIA. Talks restarted, however, and between 1973 and 1975 there were 10 meetings of the North-South Coordinating Committee at Panmunjom.

In the late 1970s, US President Jimmy Carter hoped to achieve peace in Korea. However, his plans were derailed because of the unpopularity of his proposed withdrawal of troops.

In 1983, a North Korean proposal for three-way talks with the United States and South Korea coincided with the Rangoon assassination attempt against the South Korean President. This contradictory behavior has never been explained.

In September 1984, North Korea's Red Cross sent emergency supplies to the South after severe floods. Talks resumed, resulting in the first reunion of separated families in 1985, as well as a series of cultural exchanges. Goodwill dissipated with the staging of the US-South Korean military exercise, Team Spirit, in 1986.

When Seoul was chosen to host the 1988 Summer Olympics, North Korea tried to arrange a boycott by its Communist allies or a joint hosting of the Games. This failed, and the bombing of Korean Air Flight 858 in 1987 was seen as North Korea's revenge. However, at the same time, amid a global thawing of the Cold War, the newly elected South Korean President Roh Tae-woo launched a diplomatic initiative known as Nordpolitik. This proposed the interim development of a "Korean Community", which was similar to a North Korean proposal for a confederation. From 4 to 7 September 1990, high-level talks were held in Seoul, at the same time that the North was protesting about the Soviet Union normalizing relations with the South. These talks led in 1991 to the Agreement on Reconciliation, Non-Aggression, Exchanges and Cooperation and the Joint Declaration of the Denuclearization of the Korean Peninsula. This coincided with the admission of both North and South Korea into the United Nations. Meanwhile, on 25 March 1991, a unified Korean team first used the Korean Unification Flag at the World Table Tennis Competition in Japan, and on 6 May 1991, a unified team competed at the World Youth Football Competition in Portugal.

There were limits to the thaw in relations, however. In 1989, Lim Su-kyung, a South Korean student activist who participated in the World Youth Festival in Pyongyang, was jailed on her return.

Sunshine and shadow

The end of the Cold War brought economic crisis to North Korea and led to expectations that reunification was imminent. North Koreans began to flee to the South in increasing numbers. According to official statistics there were 561 defectors living in South Korea in 1995, and over 10,000 in 2007.

In December 1991 both states made an accord, the Agreement on Reconciliation, Non-Aggression, Exchange and Cooperation, pledging non-aggression and cultural and economic exchanges. They also agreed on prior notification of major military movements and established a military hotline, and working on replacing the armistice with a "peace regime".

In 1994, concern over North Korea's nuclear program led to the Agreed Framework between the US and North Korea.

In 1998, South Korean President Kim Dae-jung announced a Sunshine Policy towards North Korea. Despite a naval clash in 1999, this led in June 2000, to the first Inter-Korean summit, between Kim Dae-jung and Kim Jong-il. As a result, Kim Dae-jung was awarded the Nobel Peace Prize. The summit was followed in August by a family reunion. In September, the North and South Korean teams marched together at the Sydney Olympics. Trade increased to the point where South Korea became North Korea's largest trading partner. Starting in 1998, the Mount Kumgang Tourist Region was developed as a joint venture between the North Korean government and Hyundai. In 2003, the Kaesong Industrial Region was established to allow South Korean businesses to invest in the North. In the early 2000s South Korea ceased infiltrating its agents into the North.

US President George W Bush, however, did not support the Sunshine Policy and in 2002 branded North Korea as a member of an Axis of Evil.

Continuing concerns about North Korea's potential to develop nuclear missiles led in 2003 to the six-party talks that included North Korea, South Korea, the US, Russia, China, and Japan. In 2006, however, North Korea resumed testing missiles and on 9 October conducted its first nuclear test.

The 15 June 2000 Joint Declaration that the two leaders signed during the first South-North summit stated that they would hold the second summit at an appropriate time. It was originally envisaged that the second summit would be held in South Korea, but that did not happen. South Korean President Roh Moo-hyun walked across the Korean Demilitarized Zone on 2 October 2007 and traveled on to Pyongyang for talks with Kim Jong-il.
The two sides reaffirmed the spirit of 15 June Joint Declaration and had discussions on various issues related to realizing the advancement of south–north relations, peace on the Korean Peninsula, common prosperity of the people and the unification of Korea. On 4 October 2007, South Korean President Roh Moo-hyun and North Korean leader Kim Jong-il signed a peace declaration. The document called for international talks to replace the Armistice which ended the Korean War with a permanent peace treaty.

During this period political developments were reflected in art. The films Shiri, in 1999, and Joint Security Area, in 2000, gave sympathetic representations of North Koreans.

Sunshine policy ends

Lee Myung-bak government 

The Sunshine Policy was formally abandoned by the new South Korean President Lee Myung-bak in 2010.

On 26 March 2010, the 1,500-ton ROKS Cheonan with a crew of 104, sank off Baengnyeong Island in the Yellow Sea. Seoul said there was an explosion at the stern, and was investigating whether a torpedo attack was the cause. Out of 104 sailors, 46 died and 58 were rescued. South Korean President Lee Myung-bak convened an emergency meeting of security officials and ordered the military to focus on rescuing the sailors. On 20 May 2010, a team of international researchers published results claiming that the sinking had been caused by a North Korean torpedo; North Korea rejected the findings. South Korea agreed with the findings from the research group and President Lee Myung-bak declared afterwards that Seoul would cut all trade with North Korea as part of measures primarily aimed at striking back at North Korea diplomatically and financially. North Korea denied all such allegations and responded by severing ties between the countries and announced it abrogated the previous non-aggression agreement.

On 23 November 2010, North Korea's artillery fired at South Korea's Yeonpyeong island in the Yellow Sea and South Korea returned fire. Two South Korean marines and two civilians were killed, more than a dozen were wounded, including three civilians. About 10 North Koreans were believed to be killed; however, the North Korean government denies this. The town was evacuated and South Korea warned of stern retaliation, with President Lee Myung-bak ordering the destruction of a nearby North Korea missile base if further provocation should occur. The official North Korean news agency, KCNA, stated that North Korea only fired after the South had "recklessly fired into our sea area".

In 2011 it was revealed that North Korea abducted four high-ranking South Korean military officers in 1999.

Park Geun-hye government
On 12 December 2012, North Korea launched the Kwangmyŏngsŏng-3 Unit 2, a scientific and technological satellite, and it reached orbit. In response, the United States deployed its warships in the region. January–September 2013 saw an escalation of tensions between North Korea and South Korea, the United States, and Japan that began because of United Nations Security Council Resolution 2087, which condemned North Korea for the launch of Kwangmyŏngsŏng-3 Unit 2. The crisis was marked by extreme escalation of rhetoric by the new North Korean administration under Kim Jong-un and actions suggesting imminent nuclear attacks against South Korea, Japan, and the United States.

The King 2 Hearts was a 2012 South Korean television series, starring Ha Ji-won and Lee Seung-gi in the leading roles. It was about a South Korean crown prince who falls in love with a North Korean special agent. The series aired on MBC from 21 March to 24 May 2012 on Wednesdays and Thursdays at 21:55 for 20 episodes.

On 24 March 2014, a crashed North Korean drone was found near Paju, the onboard cameras contained pictures of the Blue House and military installations near the DMZ. On 31 March, following an exchange of artillery fire into the waters of the NLL, a North Korean drone was found crashed on Baengnyeongdo. On 15 September, wreckage of a suspected North Korean drone was found by a fisherman in the waters near Baengnyeongdo, the drone was reported to be similar to one of the North Korean drones which had crashed in March 2014.

According to a 2014 BBC World Service poll, 3% of South Koreans viewed North Korea's influence positively, with 91% expressing a negative view, making South Korea, after Japan, the country with the most negative feelings of North Korea in the world. However, a 2014 government-funded survey found 13% of South Koreans viewed North Korea as hostile, and 58% of South Koreans believed North Korea was a country they should cooperate with.

On 1 January 2015, Kim Jong-un, in his New Year's address to the country, stated that he was willing to resume higher-level talks with the South.

In the first week of August 2015, a mine went off at the DMZ, wounding two South Korean soldiers. The South Korean government accused the North of planting the mine, which the North denied. After that South Korea restarted propaganda broadcasts to the North.

On 20 August 2015, North Korea fired a shell on the city of Yeoncheon. South Korea launched several artillery rounds in response. There were no casualties in the South, but some local residents evacuated. The shelling caused both countries to adopt pre-war statuses and a talk that was held by high level officials in the Panmunjeom to relieve tensions on 22 August 2015, and the talks carried over to the next day. Nonetheless, while talks were going on, North Korea deployed over 70 percent of their submarines, which increased the tension once more on 23 August 2015. Talks continued into the next day and finally concluded on 25 August when both parties reached an agreement and military tensions were eased.

Despite peace talks between South Korea and North Korea on 9 September 2016 regarding the North's missile test, North Korea continued to progress with its missile testing. North Korea carried out its fifth nuclear test as part of the state's 68th anniversary since its founding. In response South Korea revealed that it had a plan to assassinate Kim Jong-un.

According to a 2017 Korea Institute for National Unification, 58% of South Korean citizens had responded that unification is necessary. Among the respondents of the 2017 survey, 14% said 'we really need unification' while 44% said 'we kind of need the unification'. Regarding the survey question of 'Do we still need unification even if ROK and DPRK could peacefully coexist?', 46% agreed and 32% disagreed.

Thaw in 2017 and 2018 

In May 2017 Moon Jae-in was elected President of South Korea with a promise to return to the Sunshine Policy. In his New Year address for 2018, North Korean leader Kim Jong-un proposed sending a delegation to the upcoming Winter Olympics in South Korea. The Seoul–Pyongyang hotline was reopened after almost two years. At the Winter Olympics, North and South Korea marched together in the opening ceremony and fielded a united women's ice hockey team. As well as the athletes, North Korea sent an unprecedented high-level delegation, headed by Kim Yo-jong, sister of Kim Jong-un, and President Kim Yong-nam, and including performers like the Samjiyon Orchestra. A North Korean art troupe also performed in two separate South Korean cities, including Seoul, in honor of the Olympic games as well. The North Korean ship which carried the art troupe, Man Gyong Bong 92, was also the first North Korean ship to arrive in South Korea since 2002. The delegation passed on an invitation to President Moon to visit North Korea.

Following the Olympics, authorities of the two countries raised the possibility that they could host the 2021 Asian Winter Games together. On 1 April, South Korean K-pop stars performed a concert in Pyongyang entitled "Spring is Coming", which was attended by Kim Jong-un and his wife. The K-pop stars were part of a 160-member South Korean art troupe which performed in North Korea in early April 2018. It also marked the first time since 2005 that any South Korean artist performed in North Korea. Meanwhile, propaganda broadcasts stopped on both sides.

On 27 April, a summit took place between Moon and Kim in the South Korean zone of the Joint Security Area. It was the first time since the Korean War that a North Korean leader had entered South Korean territory. North Korean leader Kim Jong-un and South Korea's President Moon Jae-in met at the line that divides Korea. The summit ended with both countries pledging to work towards complete denuclearization of the Korean Peninsula. They also vowed to declare an official end to the Korean War within a year. As part of the Panmunjom Declaration which was signed by leaders of both countries, both sides also called for the end of longstanding military activities in the region of the Korean border and a reunification of Korea. Also, the leaders agreed to work together to connect and modernise their railways.

On 5 May, North Korea adjusted its time zone to match the South's. In May, South Korea began removing propaganda loudspeakers from the border area in line with the Panmunjom Declaration.

Moon and Kim met a second time on 26 May to discuss Kim's upcoming summit with Trump. The summit led to further meetings between North and South Korean officials during June. On 1 June, officials from both countries agreed to move forward with the military and Red Cross talks. They also agreed to reopen an Inter-Korean Liaison Office in Kaesong that the South had shut down in February 2016 after a North Korean nuclear test. The second meeting, involving the Red Cross and military, was held at North Korea's Mount Kumgang resort on 22 June where it was agreed that family reunions would resume. After the summit in April, a summit between US President Donald Trump and Kim Jong-un was held on 12 June 2018 in Singapore. South Korea hailed it as a success.

South Korea announced on 23 June 2018 that it would not conduct annual military exercises with the US in September, and would also stop its own drills in the Yellow Sea, in order to not provoke North Korea and to continue a peaceful dialog.
On 1 July 2018 South and North Korea have resumed ship-to-ship radio communication, which could prevent accidental clashes between South and North Korean military vessels around the Northern Limit Line (NLL) in the West (Yellow) Sea. On 17 July 2018, South and North Korea fully restored their military communication line on the western part of the peninsula.

South Korea and North Korea competed as "Korea" in some events at the 2018 Asian Games. The co-operation extended to the film industry, with South Korea giving their approval to screen North Korean movies at the country's local festival while inviting several moviemakers from the latter.
In August 2018 reunions of families divided since the Korean War took place at Mount Kumgang in North Korea. In September, at a summit with Moon in Pyongyang, Kim agreed to dismantle North Korea's nuclear weapons facilities if the United States took reciprocal action. In Pyongyang, an agreement titled the "Pyongyang Joint Declaration of September 2018" was signed by both Korean leaders The agreement calls for the removal of landmines, guard posts, weapons, and personnel in the JSA from both sides of the North-South Korean border. They also agreed that they would establish buffer zones on their borders to prevent clashes. Moon became the first South Korean leader to give a speech to the North Korean public when he addressed 150,000 spectators at the Arirang Festival on 19 September. Also during the September 2018 summit, military leaders from both countries signed an Agreement on Reconciliation, Non-Aggression, Exchanges and Cooperation" (a.k.a. "the Basic Agreement") to help ensure less military tension between both countries and greater arms control.

On 23 October 2018, Moon ratified the Basic Agreement and Pyongyang Declaration just hours after they were approved by his cabinet.

On 30 November 2018, a South Korean train crossed the DMZ border with North Korea and stopped at Panmun Station. This was the first time a South Korean train had entered North Korean territory since 2008.

Moon–Kim diplomacy 2019–2022

2019
On 30 June, Kim and Moon met again in the DMZ, joined by US President Trump who initiated the meeting. The three held a meeting at the Inter-Korean House of Freedom. Meanwhile, North Korea conducted a series of short–range missile tests, and the US and South Korea took part in joint military drills in August. On 16 August 2019, North Korea's ruling party made a statement criticizing the South for participating in the drills and for buying US military hardware, calling it a "grave provocation" and saying there would be no more negotiation.

On 5 August, South Korea's president Moon Jae-in spoke during a meeting with his senior aides at the presidential Blue House in Seoul, discussing Japan's imposed trade restrictions to Korea as a result of historical issues. Moon then withdrew South Korea from an intelligence-sharing agreement with Japan, seeking a breakthrough with North Korea in the process, but opted against it at the last minute. In a meeting at Seoul's presidential Blue House in August 2019, amid an escalating trade row between South Korea and Japan, Moon expressed his willingness to cooperate economically with North Korea to overtake Japan's economy.

On 15 October, North and South Korea played a FIFA World Cup qualifier in Pyongyang, their first football match in the North in 30 years. The game was played behind closed doors with attendance open only to a total of 100 North Korean government personnel; no fans or South Korean media were allowed into the stadium, and the game was not broadcast live. No goals were scored. Meanwhile, Kim and Moon continued to have a close, respectful relationship.

The 2019 South Korea Defense White Paper does not label North Korea as an "enemy" or "threat" for the first time in history. While not explicitly calling North Korea an enemy, the paper mentions that North Korea's weapons of mass destruction threaten peace and stability on the Korean Peninsula.

2020
On 9 June 2020, North Korea began cutting off all of its communication lines with South Korea. This came after Pyongyang had repeatedly warned Seoul regarding matters such as the failure of the South to stop North Korean expatriate activists from sending anti-regime propaganda leaflets across the border. The Korean Central News Agency described it as "the first step of the determination to completely shut down all contact means with South Korea and get rid of unnecessary things". The sister of Kim Jong-un, Kim Yo-jong, as well as the Vice Chair of the Central Committee of the ruling Workers' Party of Korea, Kim Yong-chol, stated that North Korea had begun to treat South Korea as its enemy. A week prior to these actions, Kim Yo-Jong had called North Korean defectors "human scum" and "mongrel dogs". The severing of communication lines substantially diminished the agreements that were made in 2018.

On 13 June, Kim Yo-jong, warned that "before long, a tragic scene of the useless North-South joint liaison office completely collapsed would be seen." On 16 June, the North threatened to return troops that had been withdrawn from the border to posts where they had been previously stationed. Later that day, the joint liaison office in Kaesong was blown up by the North Korean government. Due to the COVID-19 pandemic, the South Korean delegation had departed from the building in January. On 5 June 2020, the North Korean foreign minister Ri Son-gwon said that prospects for peace between North and South Korea, and the U.S., had "faded away into a dark nightmare". On 21 June 2020, South Korea urged North Korea to not send propaganda leaflets across the border. The request followed the North's statement that it was ready to send 12 million leaflets, which could potentially become the largest psychological campaign against South Korea.

On 14 December 2020, the South Korean parliament passed a law which criminalized the launching of propaganda leaflets into North Korea. This ban applies to not only the large amount of balloon propaganda leaflets which have been sent into North Korea over the years, but also leaflets that have been sent in bottles in rivers which run along the Korean border. Violators of the law, which went into effect three months after it was approved, face up to three years in prison or 30 million won ($27,400) in fines.

2021
In February-March 2021, South Korea continued to omit North Korea's "enemy" status from the South Korean military's White Paper after downgrading the status of Japan.

In a statement made on 4 October 2021, South Korea's Unification Ministry announced that communication lines between North and South Korea have been restored. The reopening followed North Korean leader Kim Jong-un's vow to restart communication with South Korea. The two countries' militaries have also restored their hotline along the east and west coasts, according to the South Korean Defense Ministry.

Artistic depictions
Crash Landing on You was a 2019–2020 South Korean television series directed by Lee Jeong-hyeo and featuring Hyun Bin, Son Ye-jin, Kim Jung-hyun, and Seo Ji-hye. It is about a South Korean woman who accidentally crash-lands in North Korea. It aired on tvN in South Korea and on Netflix worldwide from 14 December 2019 to 16 February 2020.

Ashfall, also known as: Mount Paektu, was a 2019 South Korean action film directed by Lee Hae-jun and Kim Byung-seo, starring Lee Byung-hun, Ha Jung-woo, Ma Dong-seok, Bae Suzy and Jeon Hye-jin. The film was released in December 2019 in South Korea. In the film, the volcano of Baekdu Mountain suddenly erupts, causing severe earthquakes in both North and South Korea.

Yoon Suk-yeol government
During his election campaign in 2021,  Yoon Suk-yeol said that he would ask that the United States to redeploy tactical nuclear weapons in South Korea if there is a threat from North Korea. U.S. Deputy Assistant Secretary of State for Japan and Korea Mark Lambert rejected Yoon's call, saying said the proposal was against U.S. policy.

In November 2022, a US-South Korean air force exercise named Vigilant Storm was countered by North Korea by missile tests and an air force exercise.

See also

 North Korea and weapons of mass destruction
 June 15th North–South Joint Declaration
 Northern Limit Line
 List of border incidents involving North Korea
 North Korea–South Korea football rivalry
 2017–18 North Korea crisis
 North Korea–United States relations
 North Korea–Russia relations
 China–North Korea relations
 China–South Korea relations
 Russia–South Korea relations
 South Korea–United States relations
 Japan–North Korea relations
 Japan–South Korea relations
 Korean conflict
 Sunshine Policy
 Inter-Korean summit
 Inter-Korean Liaison Office
 Seoul–Pyongyang hotline
 2018–19 Korean peace process
 Cross-Strait relations

References

External links

 Inter-Korean Relations: Past, Present and Future (Introduction) – cfr.org
 Inter-Korean Relations: Past, Present and Future (Panel 1) – cfr.org
 ROK and Inter-Korean relations
 Eating the Oxen of the Sun – The Odyssey of Unification
 Inter-Korean tensions: ideology first, at any cost? by Alain Nass (expert on Asia and Korea), Asia & Pacific Network, October 2011
 Research Council on Unification Policy 
 Korea Institute of national unification 
 Brookings Institution 
 New York Times on North Korea

 
South Korea
Bilateral relations of South Korea